The Sind bat (Rhyneptesicus nasutus) is a species of vesper bat and the only member of the genus Rhyneptesicus. It inhabits forests and arid areas near waterbodies in southwestern Saudi Arabia, Yemen and Oman, around the coast of the Gulf of Oman in southern Iraq and Iran. Its presence in Bahrain, Qatar and the United Arab Emirates is uncertain.

References

Eptesicus
Mammals of Afghanistan
Mammals of Pakistan
Mammals described in 1877
Taxa named by George Edward Dobson
Bats of Asia
Taxonomy articles created by Polbot